Oleksander Viktorovych Osetsky (June 24, 1873 Kremenets, Volhynian Governorate, now Ternopil Oblast – February 26, 1937 Paris) was a Ukrainian military officer.  He was a general in the army of the Ukrainian People's Republic (UNR).  

From 1914 to 1918, during the First World War, he served in and commanded a regiment in the Imperial Russian Army and reached the rank of Brigadier General. When the Russian Revolution broke out in 1917, he joined the UNR Army.  He served as a commander in the Poltava region, commander of a Railroad Guard Corps under the Hetman government, and commander of the Kholm Group on the Polish front in 1919, during the Polish-Ukrainian War.  From December 1918 to January 1919 he was minister of defense of the Ukrainian People's Republic, and then the UNR Army otaman. In 1920 he headed a UNR military-diplomatic mission to Belgium.  He emigrated to France and died in Paris in 1937.

References

 Oleksander Osetsky at the Encyclopedia of Ukraine
 Ihor Pidkova (editor), Roman Shust (editor), "Dovidnyk z istorii Ukrainy ", 3 Volumes, "(t. 3) , Kyiv, 1993–1999,  (t. 1),  (t. 2),  (t. 3). Article: Олександр Осецький  

1872 births
1937 deaths
People from Kremenets
People from Kremenetsky Uyezd
Ukrainian people in the Russian Empire
Defence ministers of Ukraine
Government ministers of the Ukrainian People's Republic
Imperial Russian Army generals
Ukrainian people of World War I
Russian military personnel of World War I
Generals of the Ukrainian People's Republic
Recipients of the Order of St. Anna, 2nd class
Recipients of the Order of St. Anna, 3rd class
Recipients of the Order of St. Anna, 4th class